National Tertiary Route 613, or just Route 613 (or ) is a National Road Route of Costa Rica, located in the Puntarenas province.

Description
In Puntarenas province the route covers Coto Brus canton (San Vito, Sabalito districts).

References

Highways in Costa Rica